Francis Patrick McFarland (Franklin, Pennsylvania, 16 April 1819 – Hartford, Connecticut, 2 October 1874) was an American Catholic bishop who served as the third Bishop of Hartford.

Biography

His parents, John McFarland and Mary McKeever, emigrated from Armagh, and took up farming near Waynesboro, Pennsylvania. Francis was employed as teacher in the village school, but soon entered Mount St. Mary's College, Emmitsburg, Maryland, where he graduated with high honours and was retained as teacher. The following year, 1845, he was ordained, 18 May, at St. Patrick's Old Cathedral in New York by Archbishop Hughes, who immediately detailed the young priest to a professor's chair at St. John's College, Fordham. Father McFarland, from his college, made missionary journeys among scattered Catholics, frequently attending sick calls in Stamford, Connecticut.

Preferring pastoral work to teaching, he was assigned as an assistant to the Church of St. Joseph in Greenwich Village, before being appointed to the missions based out of St. Mary's Church in  Watertown, New York in 1846. The Diocese of Albany was split from New York in 1847. In March 1851, he was transferred by his new ordinary, Bishop John McCloskey of Albany, to St. John's Church, Utica.

McFarland was appointed Vicar-Apostolic of Florida, 9 March 1857 but declined this, only to be elected Bishop of Hartford, to succeed Bishop Bernard O'Reilly who had died at sea, returning from Europe, in the sinking of the SS Pacific. He was consecrated at St. Patrick's Church, Providence, Rhode Island 14 March 1858, by Archbishop Hughes of New York; the sermon was given by Bishop McCloskey of Albany. Bishop McFarland resided in Providence, as had his predecessor, until the division of his diocese in 1872 which created a separate Diocese of Providence from that of Hartford.

Failing health prompted him, while attending the First Vatican Council, to resign his see. His colleagues of the American episcopate would not hear of such a step. By dividing the diocese it was hoped that his burden would be sufficiently lightened. He left Providence for Hartford 28 February 1872. After reorganizing his diocese he immediately set about the erection of a cathedral by purchasing the old Morgan estate on Farmington Avenue. He introduced into the diocese the Franciscan Friars, the Sisters of the Third Order of St. Francis, who settled at Winsted, Connecticut; the Christian Brothers, The Sisters of Charity, and the Congregation De Notre Dame. He also built a convent near the cathedral for the Sisters of Mercy. The convent's St. Joseph Chapel served as the diocesan pro-cathedral until the Cathedral of St. Joseph was built.

Bishop McFarland died in the evening of October 2, 1874, aged 55. Initially buried on the grounds of the pro-cathedral, his remains were moved to cathedral crypt in 1892.

See also

 Catholic Church in the United States
 Historical list of the Catholic bishops of the United States
 List of Catholic bishops of the United States

References

External links
Roman Catholic Archdiocese of Hartford

1819 births
1874 deaths
People from Franklin, Pennsylvania
19th-century Roman Catholic bishops in the United States
Mount St. Mary's University alumni
Fordham University faculty
Roman Catholic bishops of Hartford
Catholics from Pennsylvania